Jozi-H is a Canadian-South African television drama series, which aired in 2006 and 2007. Coproduced by Morula Pictures of South Africa and Inner City Films from Canada, the series was a medical drama set at an inner city hospital in Johannesburg, South Africa.

The show's cast included Sarah Allen as Jenny Langford, a surgical registrar from Toronto; Vincent Walsh as Russ Monsour, a neurosurgeon from Winnipeg in search of a new start after the failure of his marriage; Neil McCarthy as Dr. Michael Bellman; Billoah Greene as Dr. Greg Nash; Thami Ngubeni as Dr. Ingrid Nyoka; Tumisho Masha as Dr. Zane Jara; Lindelani Buthelezi as Dr. Nthato Moroka; Louise Barnes as nurse Jocelyn Del Rossi; and Moshidi Motshegwa as nurse Nomsa Mangena.

The series premiered on 13 October 2006 on CBC Television in Canada, and ran 13 episodes until concluding on 2 February 2007. Canadian television critics generally compared the show to ER, the dominant American medical drama series of its era.

The series was not renewed for a second season. Producer Alfons Adetuyi criticized the CBC for doing far too little in his estimation to actively promote the series.

In South Africa, the series premiered on SABC 3 in April 2007. It was subsequently rebroadcast by SABC 1 in 2010.

Awards

References

External links
 

2006 Canadian television series debuts
2007 Canadian television series endings
2007 South African television series debuts
2007 South African television series endings
2000s Canadian drama television series
CBC Television original programming
2000s Canadian medical television series
South African drama television series
SABC 3 original programming
Television shows set in Johannesburg, South Africa
2000s Black Canadian television series